The 1990 European Figure Skating Championships was a senior-level international competition held in Leningrad, Soviet Union (present-day Saint Petersburg, Russia) from 30 January to 4 February 1990. Elite skaters from European ISU member nations competed in the disciplines of men's singles, ladies' singles, pair skating, and ice dancing.

Results

Men

Ladies

Pairs

Ice dancing

References

External links
 https://www.nytimes.com/1990/02/02/sports/results-plus-879590.html
 https://web.archive.org/web/20081026042005/http://www.eskatefans.com/skatabase/euromen1990.html
 https://web.archive.org/web/20091128190759/http://www.eskatefans.com/skatabase/majors.html

European Figure Skating Championships
European Figure Skating Championships
European Figure Skating Championships
European Figure Skating Championships
European Figure Skating Championships
International figure skating competitions hosted by the Soviet Union
European Figure Skating Championships
Sports competitions in Saint Petersburg